André Braun (born 1 May 1944) is a Luxembourgian archer. He competed at the 1980 Summer Olympics and the 1984 Summer Olympics.

References

1944 births
Living people
Luxembourgian male archers
Olympic archers of Luxembourg
Archers at the 1980 Summer Olympics
Archers at the 1984 Summer Olympics
Sportspeople from Esch-sur-Alzette